The Alpina B5 and D5 (G30) are a series of high performance executive cars manufactured by German Automobile manufacturer Alpina. Introduced at the 2017 Geneva Motor Show, the car is the third generation of the B5 and succeeds the Alpina B5 (F10). Based on the BMW 5 Series (G30), the car is available in both saloon and wagon bodystyles.

Overview

Based on the BMW M550i, the B5 uses a modified version of its 4.4-litre N63 twin-turbocharged V8 engine called the N63TU2. Modifications made to the engine include the addition of a newly designed cold air intake system, a redesigned cooling system, higher compression Mahle pistons, two twin-scroll Garrett turbochargers, a larger intercooler, new NGK spark plugs and an Alpina specific ECU. In addition, a lightweight exhaust system is also installed which reduces back pressure. Due to the extensive torque produced by the engine, the 8-speed automatic transmission manufactured by ZF Friedrichshafen fitted to the M550i had to be redesigned. Stiffer internals and a torque converter were added in order for the transmission to handle the engine's power output. The resulting transmission also has quicker shift times than the original unit and comes with a launch control feature. Although the transmission only allows for 100 launches under the launch control before disabling the feature for reliability reasons.

The B5 is fitted with a new suspension system featuring aluminium components at the front. The system has springs supplied by Eibach and dampers supplied by Bilstein along with stiffer bushings to improve handling and to reduce understeer. A new "Comfort" mode adds smooth ride quality. The system features custom wishbones and 1 degree of negative camber for enhanced performance. The Touring version features a pneumatically suspended rear axle. A limited slip differential built by Drexler is optional. The car comes with steel brakes as standard but a composite high performance braking system is optional.

The car is fitted with 20-inch forged multi-spoke alloy wheels claimed to save  of weight wrapped in Pirelli P Zero tyres developed specially for the car. The car is fitted with BMW's xDrive all-wheel-drive system which can divert up to 75 per cent of its power and torque to the rear wheels and up to 90 per cent with the stability control in its loosest setting. This is the first generation of the B5 to be offered with only all-wheel drive. The active roll stabilisation and four wheel steering have been carried over from the M550i and recalibrated.

The car features a Lavalina leather upholstery, wood trim and features new blue Alpina gauges. It also comes with the BMW Comfort seats which are included as standard equipment. There is also a numbered plaque on the interior located just behind the rotary controller of the iDrive infotainment system. The interior has vast customisation options according to the customer's desire.

Exterior wise, the car is fitted with a front chin spoiler with Alpina lettering, a rear lip spoiler, a windshield spoiler and has Decko pinstriping on the paint as optional equipment.

Variants

D5 S

Unveiled at the 2017 Frankfurt Auto Show, the D5 S is the diesel engine variant of the B5. Based on the BMW 535d xDrive M Sport, The modified BMW B57 straight-6 engine features three turbochargers (one low pressure and two high pressure turbochargers) which is a feature exclusive to the left hand market cars, the right hand market cars use a twin-turbocharged variant of the engine. Power outputs also vary for the two engines. The Touring body style is also not offered in right hand markets. Other modifications remain the same as the B5.

References

B5
Cars introduced in 2017
All-wheel-drive vehicles
Euro NCAP executive cars
Wagons
Sedans